When the Heart Calls is a 1912 American silent era short Western comedy film starring Lee Moran, Russell Bassett, Louise Glaum, and Victoria Forde.

Directed by Al Christie and produced by the Nestor Company, it was distributed by the Universal Film Company.

When the Heart Calls was filmed at Nestor Studios, the first studio actually located in Hollywood, which was merged with Universal in 1912. It marked Glaum's movie debut.

Cast
 Lee Moran as Dick Lee, the city chap
 Russell Bassett as James Gordon, the ranchman
 Louise Glaum as Mary Gordon, the ranchman's daughter
 Victoria Forde as Lillian West, the ranchman's fiancée
 Myrtle Stedman as White Bird

See also
 List of American films of 1912

References

External links
 

1912 films
1910s English-language films
American silent short films
1910s Western (genre) comedy films
American black-and-white films
1912 short films
American comedy short films
1912 comedy films
Silent American Western (genre) comedy films
1910s American films